This is a list of consuls known to have held office, from the beginning of the Roman Republic to the latest use of the title in Imperial times, together with those magistrates of the Republic who were appointed in place of consuls, or who superseded consular authority for a limited period.

Background

Republican consuls
From the establishment of the Republic to the time of Augustus, the consuls were the chief magistrates of the Roman state, and normally there were two of them, so that the executive power of the state was not vested in a single individual, as it had been under the kings.  As other ancient societies dated historical events according to the reigns of their kings, it became customary at Rome to date events by the names of the consuls in office when the events occurred, rather than (for instance) by counting the number of years since the foundation of the city, although that method could also be used. If a consul died during his year of office, another was elected to replace him. Although his imperium was the same as his predecessor's, he was termed consul suffectus, in order to distinguish him from the consul ordinarius whom he replaced; but the eponymous magistrates for each year were normally the consules ordinarii.

Because of this method of dating events, it was important to keep records of each year's eponymous magistrates. Many such lists have survived, either in the form of monumental inscriptions, conventionally referred to as fasti, or indirectly through the ancient historians, who had access to linen rolls recording the names of magistrates. Although these lists account for the entire period of the Republic, and most of Imperial times, there are discrepancies due to gaps and disagreements between different sources. Many of these no doubt arose as copying errors, especially those that involved the substitution of a familiar name for a less common one. Others may represent later attempts to edit the lists in order to explain deficiencies in the record, to reconcile conflicting traditions, or to ascribe particular actions or events to the time of a particular individual.

Other magistrates included
Occasionally, the authority of the consuls was temporarily superseded by the appointment of a dictator, who held greater imperium than that of the consuls.  By tradition, these dictators laid down their office upon the completion of the task for which they were nominated, or after a maximum period of six months, and did not continue in office longer than the year for which the nominating consul had been elected.  However, in four years at the end of the fourth century BC, dictators are said to have continued in office in the year following their nomination, in place of consuls. Modern scholars are skeptical of these years, which might be due to later editing of the lists of magistrates in order to fill a gap. All known dictators have been included in this table.

Two other types of magistrates are listed during the period of the Republic. In the year 451 BC, a board of ten men, known as decemviri, or decemvirs, was appointed in place of the consuls in order to draw up the tables of Roman law, in a sense establishing the Roman constitution. According to tradition, a second college of decemvirs was appointed for the next year, and these continued in office illegally into 449, until they were overthrown in a popular revolt, and the consulship was reinstated.

Among the disputes which the decemvirs failed to resolve was the relationship between the patricians, Rome's hereditary aristocracy, and the plebeians, or common citizens. Although it has been argued that some of the consuls prior to the Decemvirate may have been plebeians, the office was definitely closed to them in the second half of the fifth century BC.  To prevent open hostility between the two orders, the office of military tribune with consular power, or "consular tribune", was established. In place of patrician consuls, the people could elect a number of military tribunes, who might be either patrician or plebeian.

According to Livy, this compromise held until 376 BC, when two of the tribunes of the plebs, Gaius Licinius Calvus Stolo and Lucius Sextius Lateranus, blocked the election of any magistrates for the following year, unless the senate would agree to place a law before the people opening the consulship to the plebeians, and effecting other important reforms. The senate refused, and the tribunes continued to prevent the election of magistrates for several years until the senate capitulated, and the lex Licinia Sextia was passed, leading to the election of the first plebeian consul in 367. Other accounts of this event are inconsistent, and current scholarly opinion is that the duration of the period without magistrates may have been exaggerated, or even invented to fill a gap in the record; nevertheless Roman tradition unanimously holds that Licinius and Sextius were able to open the consulship to the plebeians.

The consulship in imperial times
In Imperial times the consulship became the senior administrative office under the emperors, who frequently assumed the title of consul themselves, and appointed other consuls at will.  The consulship was often bestowed as a political favour, or a reward for faithful service.  Because there could only be two consuls at once, the emperors frequently appointed several sets of suffecti sequentially in the course of a year; holding the consulship for an entire year became a special honour. As the office lost much of its executive authority, and the number of consuls appointed for short and often irregular periods increased, surviving lists from Imperial times are often incomplete, and have been reconstructed from many sources, not always with much certainty. In many cases it is stated that a particular person had been consul, but the exact time cannot be firmly established.

As an institution, the consulship survived the abdication of the last emperor of the West, and for a time consuls continued to be appointed, one representing the Eastern Roman Empire, and the other the Western, even as the Western Empire dissolved as a political entity. The last consuls appointed represented only the Eastern Empire, until finally the title became the sole province of the Emperor, who might or might not assume it upon taking office.

Chronology
For the early Republic, this article observes the Varronian chronology, established by the historian Marcus Terentius Varro, who calculated that Rome was founded in what is now called the year 753 BC (the founding of the city was traditionally observed on the Palilia, a festival occurring on April 21).  This becomes the year 1 ab urbe condita, or AUC.  The Republic was established in 245 AUC, or 509 BC. Although other ancient historians gave different years, Varro's chronology was the most widely accepted; it was used in the Fasti Capitolini, and its use by Censorinus brought it to the attention of Joseph Scaliger, who helped popularize its use in modern times.

For Imperial times, the dates of the consules ordinarii are far more certain than those of the suffecti, who were not recorded with the same attention as the eponymous magistrates.  Their identification and dating is far more controversial, and despite the efforts of generations of scholars, gaps in coverage remain.  Known consules suffecti are shown with their known (or reconstructed) dates of tenure, which normally varied from two to six months — although one suffect consul, Rosius Regulus, is known to have held the fasces for a single day, October 31, AD 69. Where neither consul is known or inferred for a portion of the year, their names are omitted for convenience; if one consul can be named, but his colleague is unknown, the unnamed colleague is listed as ignotus (unknown).

Consules prior and posterior
The consul named first in the lists was identified as consul prior, whereas the other was called consul posterior. The two consuls' authority was technically equal. There is evidence that, during the late Republic, the consul elected with the most votes became the consul prior, and the consul elected first also may have been the first in the year to hold fasces (take precedence), but the evidence is not conclusive. The surviving sources for the order of the consuls in the early Republic show some measure of conflict in just under half of the cases. Lily Ross Taylor argues that the emperor Augustus falsified some of the records in order to give prominence to several families, and that the order of consuls as reported by the historian Livy is the most reliable. Drummond disagrees: he argues that Livy himself switches the correct order at times for literary purposes, and that discrepant entries in the sources are most likely simply the result of negligence. Although there is probably one 'correct' order for all the consuls of the republic, or at least one underlying tradition reporting it, no surviving source seems to be more reliable than another to a significant extent.

When the emperor assumed the consulship, he was necessarily consul prior. This distinction continued until the fourth century AD, when the Empire was divided into a Western Roman Empire and an Eastern Roman Empire: the consuls who were appointed by the court in the Western Empire, which was sometimes at Rome, are commonly identified as the "Western consul", and those appointed by the court in the Eastern, usually Constantinople, the "Eastern consul". These designations were used until the end of the consulship in the sixth century.

Other lists of consuls
For a list of consuls whose year of office is uncertain or entirely unknown (usually suffecti, although some of the ordinarii in the breakaway Gallic Empire also lack dates), see the List of undated Roman consuls.  For those individuals who were elected consul but never assumed the office due to death, disgrace, or any other reason, see List of Roman consuls designate.

Key

Latin terms
  (abbreviated Imp.) = literally "commander"; originally an honorary title bestowed upon a general by his soldiers, the term later became part of the style of the emperors, and the word "emperor" is derived from it.
  (abbreviated suff.) = a substitute elected or appointed in place of a magistrate who died or resigned.  Information is not available for all consules suffecti, and some may not be listed.
  = unknown.  All consuls who can be assigned to a particular date, at least tentatively, are included in this table.  If neither consul for a given period is known, they are entirely omitted; if one is known, and the other is not, the unknown colleague is referred to as ignotus.
  = without colleague.  On a few occasions before the dissolution of the Western Empire, only one consul was appointed.
  = after the (preceding) consulship.  Used for gaps when no consuls were appointed for a period following the end of another consulship, or at least none are known to have been appointed.
  = among others.

Abbreviations for praenomina

Colors

 Consular tribunes
 Decemviri
 Dictators
 Emperor serving as consul
 Heir-apparent serving as consul

Sixth century BC (509–501)
Unless otherwise indicated, the names and dates of the consuls between 509 and 81 BC are taken from Thomas Broughton's The Magistrates of the Roman Republic.

Fifth century BC (500–401)

Fourth century BC (400–301)

Third century BC (300–201)

Second century BC (200–101)

First century BC (100–1)

First century (1–100)

Second century (101–200)

Third century (201–300)

Fourth century (301–395)

Until the fall of the Western Empire (396–480)
In 395, the Roman Empire was divided into a Western Roman Empire and an Eastern Roman Empire. The separate courts often appointed a consul each. Western consuls continued to be appointed after the fall of the Western Roman Empire in 476.

After the fall of the Western Empire (481–541)

Roman consuls of the East alone (541–887)
During the reign of Justinian I (527–565), the position of consul altered in two significant ways. From 535, there was no longer a Roman consul chosen in the West. In 541, the separate office of Roman consul was abolished. When used thereafter, the office was used as part of the imperial title. The office was finally abolished as part of the Basilika reforms of Leo VI the Wise in 887. The late antique practice of granting honorary consulships eventually evolved into the Byzantine court dignity of hypatos (the Greek translation of the Latin consul), which survived until the 12th century.
 566: 
 568: 
 579: 
 583: 
 603: 
 608: Heraclius & Heraclius
 611: 
 632: 
 639: 
 642: 
 668: 
 686: 
 699: 
 711: 
 714: 
 716: 
 718: 
 742: 
 776: 
 782: 
 803: 
 812: 
 814: 
 821: 
 830: 
 843: 
 867: 
 887:

Endnotes

References

External links
List of Roman consuls (483 BC to AD 13) of the Fasti Capitolini
List of Roman consuls (509 BC to AD 354) in the Chronograph of 354
List of Roman consuls (509 BC to AD 468) in the Fasti of Hydatius

Ancient timelines
Consuls